Jakubkowo may refer to the following places:
Jakubkowo, Golub-Dobrzyń County in Kuyavian-Pomeranian Voivodeship (north-central Poland)
Jakubkowo, Grudziądz County in Kuyavian-Pomeranian Voivodeship (north-central Poland)
Jakubkowo, Warmian-Masurian Voivodeship (north Poland)